Nº 1 in Heaven is the eighth studio album by American rock band Sparks. Recorded with Italian disco producer Giorgio Moroder, the album marked a change of musical direction for the group and became influential on later synth-pop bands.

Released in March 1979 by Virgin Records (with initial copies on colored vinyl) and later licensed to Elektra Records in the US, Nº 1 in Heaven renewed interest in the band after disappointing sales of the preceding albums Big Beat (1976) and Introducing Sparks (1977). It is the band's only album on Elektra, the fourth label that the band was signed to in the US.

Background
In 1973, Sparks had decamped from the US to the UK, resulting in a change of lineup upon hiring English musicians to fill the roles of guitar, bass and drums. Consequently, Sparks enjoyed their first period of success, wherein their singles and albums sold well and were received warmly by the critics. After 1975's Indiscreet, the third of Sparks' UK-based albums, sold less well than its two predecessors, the Maels then chose to return to Los Angeles to rejuvenate the group.

Initially, they had returned to work with early Sparks member Earle Mankey and recorded the song "England" with him. Eventually the group turned to Rupert Holmes and recorded the heavier and more produced Big Beat (1976) with a number of session musicians. Although the album employed a more "American" sound, it did little business in the US or the UK. The next album, Introducing Sparks (1977), was much lighter but was no more successful than Big Beat. This new "West Coast" sound was deemed a failure, as the band felt the results were "bereft of personality". 

By 1978, the Mael Brothers found themselves at a crossroads; they had tired of the rock band format and were determined to take their music in a more electronic direction. They had expressed admiration for pioneering Italian producer Giorgio Moroder, creator of Donna Summer's iconic disco anthem "I Feel Love", to a German journalist who turned out to be a friend of his. Sparks then teamed up with Moroder to record Nº 1 in Heaven at Musicland Studios, West Germany.

Production
Nº 1 in Heaven had a dramatically different sound from that of Sparks' previous seven albums. The group dropped the standard guitar, bass and piano from its musical palette and the new sound was dominated by layered sequencers and synthesizers, underpinned by the drums and percussion of Keith Forsey. Russell Mael's distinctive falsetto was overlaid in a number of overdubs and complemented by backing vocalists. 

Aside from Ron Mael's lyrics and Russell's vocals, musically, the sound of the album matched that of Moroder's trademark sound that had begun with Donna Summer's "I Feel Love" and had continued in much of his solo work, with songs like "Tryouts for the Human Race" and "La Dolce Vita" continuing in the vein of his work with Summer. This sound was also exemplified on Summer's 1977 album Once Upon a Time ("Now I Need You", "Working the Midnight Shift", "Queen for a Day") and 1979's Bad Girls (in songs like "Sunset People").

The first US editions of Nº 1 in Heaven contained content identical to the original Virgin UK release, but later editions substituted the 12" extended mix of "Beat the Clock" for the album version.

Release and critical reception

Nº 1 in Heaven was promoted by the release of four singles over 1979. The first single, "La Dolce Vita", was released in early 1979 in European countries such as Germany and Italy but did not chart. "The Number One Song in Heaven" became the group's first hit since "Looks, Looks, Looks" in 1975, reaching No. 14 in the UK and No. 5 on the Irish Singles Chart. "Beat the Clock" fared even better in the UK and reached the top ten in July of that year. The final single, "Tryouts for the Human Race" (released after the album), fared less well but still charted, hitting No. 45. All singles (except "La Dolce Vita") were released on picture disc/colored vinyl, with exclusive remixes/edits. 
The album itself, while reaching the charts in the UK and therefore faring better than Sparks' previous two studio albums, managed only one week at No. 73 in September 1979.

Upon release, the reviews in the UK music press were mostly negative. NME wrote that the songs "elongated into pseudo European-drisco drama". Reviewer Ian Penman said, "Moroder's production is essentially irrelevant", and found that the album was "neither a comedy album nor a experimental album, but it possesses the near instant redundancy of both." Melody Maker panned the album concluding, "the most pathetic thing of all is that they seem to think you'll want to dance to it". Record Mirror said that the album was "a complete frustration from beginning to end" with odes to Donna Summer's "Deep Town Inside" on "My Other Voice" and to David Bowie on "Tryouts for the Human Race". Reviewer James Parade finally said: "Once upon a time, they were at least five years ahead. At the moment, they're lying two years behind". Sounds Sandy Robertson, on the other hand, wrote that "the band have found in Moroder the best filter for their ideas since Rundgren" and qualified the album as "icy sharp and fresh". Trouser Press Bruce Paley found that the songs were "solid, innovative and exciting".

Retrospective reviews have been more favourable. In a four out of five star review published on AllMusic, John Bush wrote; "the marriage of Sparks' focus on oddball pop songs to the driving disco-trance of Giorgio Moroder produced the duo's best album in years".

Legacy
Joy Division cited "Number One Song in Heaven" as a primary influence during the recording of "Love Will Tear Us Apart". Joy Division's drummer Stephen Morris stated: "When we were doing 'Love Will Tear Us Apart', there were two records we were into: Frank Sinatra's Greatest Hits and 'Number One Song in Heaven' by Sparks. That was the beginning of getting interested in Giorgio Moroder".

Track listing

Personnel
Credits are adapted from the Nº 1 in Heaven liner notes.

Sparks
 Ron Mael – keyboards, synthesiser, vocals
 Russell Mael – vocals

Additional musicians
 Keith Forsey – drums
 Giorgio Moroder – synthesiser, vocoder
 Dan Wyman – synthesiser programming
 Chris Bennett, Dennis Young, Jack Moran – backing vocals

Production and artwork
 Giorgio Moroder – producer
 Jürgen Koppers – engineer
 Steven Bartel – design
 Moshe Brakha – photography

Charts

References

External links
 

Sparks (band) albums
1979 albums
Disco albums by American artists
Albums produced by Giorgio Moroder
Virgin Records albums
Elektra Records albums
Warner Records albums
Ariola Records albums
Repertoire Records albums
Synth-pop albums by American artists